"Everything" is a song written by Fefe Dobson, Jay Levine, and James Bryan McCollum and recorded by Dobson for her self-titled debut album (2003). It was released to American radio as the album's second international single and third overall single on January 19, 2004. "Everything" was the only single from the album to miss the Canadian Singles Chart, but it did reach number nine on the Radio & Records Hot AC chart and number 13 on the CHR/Pop chart. The song is Dobson's only track to chart in the United Kingdom, peaking at number 42.

Promotion
Dobson has made appearances on MTV's TRL, The Ellen DeGeneres Show, The Sharon Osbourne Show, All That, and The Tonight Show with Jay Leno to promote the single.

Critical reception
Spin wrote that the song was a "shameless Avril rip" and listed it in the "Trash" section of their music list. Chuck Taylor of Billboard also likened the song to Avril Lavigne's music and wrote that "Everything" was "less distinctive" than Dobson's other songs and "could go either way." In a review of Fefe Dobson for Billboard, Rashaun Hall cited "Everything" as an example of the "standard pop fare" that bogs down sections of the album.

Music video
The song's music video, directed by Chris Robinson, stars some of the actors from the film The Perfect Score and includes scenes from the film. An alternate version omits the movie scenes.

Track listings
UK CD1
 "Everything" (radio edit)
 "Meet Fefe Dobson!"
 "Everything" (instrumental)
 "Everything" (video)

UK CD2
 "Everything" (radio edit)
 "Meet Fefe Dobson!"

Charts

Release history

References

Fefe Dobson songs
2003 songs
2004 singles
Island Records singles
Mercury Records singles
Music videos directed by Chris Robinson (director)
Songs written by Fefe Dobson
Songs written by James Bryan McCollum
Songs written by Jason Levine